Dr. Witold Nazarewicz (born 1954) is a Polish nuclear physicist born in Warsaw, Poland, currently teaching at Michigan State University. He is also the scientific director of the Holifield Radioactive Ion Beam Facility at Oak Ridge National Laboratory. He earned his doctorate in physics from the Warsaw Institute of Technology in 1981 and holds the title of professor ordinarius in Poland.

Dr. Nazarewicz has been twice featured in The New York Times, once on February 1, 2004 in an article about the discovery of elements 113 and 115, and the second time on October 17, 2006 in an article on the discovery of disputed Element 118, oganesson.

His University of Tennessee biography from 1999 reveals that he is the co-author of more than 225 research papers, and he is one of the most cited physicists in the world.  Dr. Nazarewicz has also co-edited several books, including The Nuclear Many-Body Problem 2001.

In 2011 he was awarded the Bonner Prize.

References

1954 births
Scientists from Warsaw
Polish nuclear physicists
American nuclear physicists
University of Tennessee faculty
Polish emigrants to the United States
Living people
Fellows of the American Physical Society